Kevin Eastwood is a Canadian documentary filmmaker and film and television producer. He is best known for directing the CBC Television documentaries Humboldt: The New Season and After the Sirens and the Knowledge Network series Emergency Room: Life + Death at VGH and British Columbia: An Untold History. His credits as a producer include the movies Fido, Preggoland and The Delicate Art of Parking, the television series The Romeo Section, and the documentaries Haida Modern, Haida Gwaii: On the Edge of the World and Eco-Pirate: The Story of Paul Watson.

Career

Eastwood started his film career in 2000 at the feature film production company, Anagram Pictures. While at Anagram, he was associate producer on Andrew Currie's first feature, Mile Zero, and co-produced the comedies The Delicate Art of Parking and Fido and was the supervising producer on the CTV movie Elijah, about the life of Canadian Indigenous leader, Elijah Harper. He left Anagram in 2008 to be an independent producer and produced his first documentary, Eco-Pirate: The Story of Paul Watson directed by Trish Dolman which was released in theatres across Canada by Entertainment One. This started him on a course of alternating producing documentaries like Do You Really Want to Know? directed by John Zaritsky, and Haida Gwaii: On the Edge of the World directed by Charles Wilkinson, with dramatic projects like Preggoland directed by Jacob Tierney, and The Romeo Section from TV creator and showrunner Chris Haddock. 

In 2013, Eastwood directed Emergency Room: Life + Death at VGH, an award-winning documentary series about the public healthcare system. Emergency Room: Life + Death at VGH brought record-breaking audiences to the Knowledge Network and won Leo Awards for Best Documentary Series and The People's Choice Award for Favourite TV series.

Since Emergency Room, Eastwood has directed Humboldt: The New Season, a documentary for CBC Television about the survivors of the Humboldt Broncos bus crash in which 16 people died (nominated in 2020 for Best Documentary Program by the Academy of Canadian Cinema and Television); After the Sirens, also for CBC, about the epidemic of PTSD among paramedics (nominated in 2019 for Best Documentary Program by the Academy of Canadian Cinema and Television); and The Death Debate, for Telus Optik TV, about the landmark Carter v Canada Supreme Court case on physician-assisted dying (Canadian Screen Award nominee for Best Direction). Eastwood also directed the music video for Post-War Blues by Dan Mangan (an homage to Dr. Strangelove starring Don McKellar); and the Gemini Award-nominated short documentary Douglas Coupland: Pop Artist, as well as multiple documentary projects for the BC Civil Liberties Association, Canada's longest-running civil liberties association.

Personal life

Eastwood was born and raised in Vancouver, Canada. His mother was a painter and his father a commercial artist. He started working in movie theatres and bought his first video camera when he was 15. He studied film at Emily Carr University of Art + Design, making him the third generation in his family to go to art school. He married his wife, Wynn Deschner, in 2016.

Filmography

Feature films 
 Mile Zero (2001) - Associate Producer
 The Delicate Art of Parking (2003) - Producer
 Fido (2006) - Producer
 Crimes of Mike Recket (2012) - Executive Producer
 Preggoland (2014) - Producer

Documentary 
 12 Takes (2010) - Director (segment: Douglas Coupland: Pop Artist)
 Eco-Pirate: The Story of Paul Watson (2011) - Producer
 Do You Really Want to Know? (2012) - Producer
 Oil Sands Karaoke (2013) - Executive Producer
 Haida Gwaii: On the Edge of the World (2015) - Executive Producer
 The Death Debate (2016) - Director/Producer/Writer
 Vancouver: No Fixed Address (2017) - Executive Producer
 After the Sirens (2018) - Director/Producer/Writer
 Humboldt: The New Season (2019) - Director/Writer
 Haida Modern (2019) - Executive Producer

Television 
 This Space for Rent (2007) - Co-Producer
 Elijah (2007) - Supervising Producer
 Confessions: Animal Hoarding (2011-2012) - Director
 Emergency Room: Life + Death at VGH (2014-2016) - Director/Co-Executive Producer
 The Romeo Section (2015-2016) - Co-Producer/Second Unit Director
 British Columbia: An Untold History (2021) - Series Director

Awards
Eastwood has won a Gemini Award from the Academy of Canadian Cinema and Television (Best TV Movie for Elijah), six Leo Awards (for British Columbia: An Untold History, Haida Modern, Emergency Room and Elijah), the Allan King Award from the Directors Guild of Canada (for Haida Gwaii: On the Edge of the World), four Golden Sheaf Awards (including the 2020 Ruth Shaw Award for Humboldt: The New Season), and the top prize at the Hot Docs Documentary Film Festival (for Haida Gwaii: On the Edge of the World). 

He has also been nominated for six Canadian Screen Awards by the Academy of Canadian Cinema and Television (for British Columbia: An Untold History, Humboldt: The New Season, After the Sirens, The Death Debate and Emergency Room), a further six Golden Sheaf Awards by the Yorkton Film Festival and a further nine Leo Awards.

References

External links 
 www.kevineastwood.ca

Living people
Canadian documentary film directors
Film directors from British Columbia
Film directors from Vancouver
Film producers from British Columbia
Canadian television producers
Emily Carr University of Art and Design alumni
Year of birth missing (living people)